Tube-gauge steam locomotives may appear to be an unlikely possibility, because of the problems of using such a machine in the confines of a tunnel less than  in diameter, but the London Underground had three such vehicles over the years. Two were built by the Hunslet Engine Company in 1899, and the third by Kerr, Stuart and Company in 1922.

Central London Railway

The Central London Railway obtained two small steam  locomotives from the Hunslet Engine Company in 1899, to assist with the task of equipping the tunnels once the civil engineering work of building them had been completed. They were numbered 1 and 2, but only the outer wheels had flanges, which enabled them to negotiate curves of  radius.

Although the cabs were wide, headroom was extremely limited, and consequently they were oil-fired, so that they could be operated by one man rather than two. Fuel tanks holding  of oil were fitted into the bunker, which could also hold 0.75 tons of coal, since the grate was designed so that either fuel could be used. Oil was always used in the tunnels, but coal was often used above ground. Once the railway opened to passengers in July 1900, the locomotives were seldom used in the tunnels, but did occasionally go into them. They were mainly used for shunting in depots and for moving coal wagons at Wood Lane power station, which operated until March 1928. However the two locomotives were scrapped in 1923.

City & South London Railway

The City & South London Railway was built with tunnels of only  diameter, but they were enlarged between 1923 and 1925, when the line amalgamated with the Charing Cross, Euston and Hampstead Railway. The machine weighed 14 tons, the saddle tank held  of water, and 0.75 tons of coal could be carried. Kerr, Stuart built a number of Brazil class locomotives, of which four -gauge examples survive in preservation, three on the Sittingbourne and Kemsley Light Railway and one on the Great Whipsnade Railway.

The locomotive became L34 in 1930, and worked on the extension of the Piccadilly line to Cockfosters. During this work it was stabled at either Cockfosters or Arnos Grove. It then moved to Drapers Field, Leyton, to work on the Central line eastern extension. This work was completed in 1949, and the locomotive was then scrapped.

References

Notes

Bibliography

External links 
 London Transport Collection photograph of CLR No. 2
 London Transport Collection photograph of No. L34

London Underground locomotives
0-4-2T locomotives
0-6-0T locomotives
Standard gauge steam locomotives of Great Britain